The Ministry of National Territory Planning, Land Planning, Housing and City Policy is the Moroccan Ministry responsible for the development and implementation of government policy in the housing and city policy sector, as well as for the reinvigoration and encouragement of social housing and the development of the real estate sector. Furthermore, it is responsible for the development of regulations for urban development and the mobilization of public property in response to the requirements of rapid urbanization and its implications for Urban development.

The ministry was established on December 7, 1955 under the name of the Ministry of Urban and Residential Development, during the appointment of the first Moroccan government after independence. Its current Minister is Fatima-Zahra Mansouri.

See also 

 Government of Morocco

References

External links 

 Website

Government ministries of Morocco